Sirgah (also romanized as Sīrgāh or Seīrgāh) is a village in Birun Bashm Rural District, Kelardasht District, Chalus County, Mazandaran Province, Iran. At the 2006 census, its population was 48, in 14 families.

References 

Populated places in Chalus County